Arundhati Devi (also known as Arundhati Mukherjee or Mukhopadhyay) (1924 – 1990) was an Indian actress, director, writer and singer who is predominantly known for her work in Bengali cinema.

Arundhati Devi was a student of Visva-Bharati University where she was trained in Rabindra Sangeet by Sailajaranjan Majumdar. She began her career as a Rabindra Sangeet singer at All India Radio in 1940. As an actress, Arundhati Devi made her film debut in Kartik Chattopadhyay's Bengali film Mahaprasthaner Pathe (1952) which also had a Hindi version under the title Yatrik. Further on she collaborated with directors such as Devaki Kumar Bose in Nabajanma (1956), Asit Sen in Chalachal (1956) and Panchatapa (1957), Prabhat Mukhopadhyay in Maa (1956), Mamata (1957), Bicharak (1959) and Akashpatal (1960), and Tapan Sinha in Kalamati (1958), Jhinder Bondi (1961), Jatugriha (1964). In 1963, she was conferred with BFJA Award for Best Actress for her role in the National Award winning Bengali film Bhagini Nivedita (1962) directed by Bijoy Bose. In 1967, she was conferred with the National Film Award for Best Film Based On High Literary Work for her directorial debut Chutti at the 14th National Film Awards.

Personal life
Arundhati was born in Barisal, Bengal Presidency, in British India (now Bangladesh). In 1955 she had a short-lived marriage with the director Prabhat Mukherjee. However, in 1957 she met film director Tapan Sinha at the Berlin International Film Festival and they eventually got married. Their son is scientist Anindya Sinha. She died on 1 January 1990.

Filmography

As actress
1976 Harmonium
1964 Jatugriha as Madhuri
1963 Nyayadanda
1962 Shiulibari
1962 Bhagini Nivedita as Sister Nivedita
1961 Jhinder Bondi 
1960 Khudita Pashan
1960 Indradhanu
1960 Akash-Patal
1959 Bicharak (she became a Producer)
1959 Shashi Babur Sansar 
1959 Pushpadhanu
1958 Manmoyee Girls' School as Niharika
1956 Chalachal
1956 Nabajanma
1955 Dashyumohan as Chapala alias Miss Sandhya Ray
1955 Du-janay
1955 Godhuli
1954 Chheley Kaar as Mili
1954 Nad-o-Nadi
1952 Mahaprasthaner Pathey as Rani
1952 Yatrik as Rani (the Hindi Version of the well-known Bengali film Maha Prasthaner Pathe, in which she played the same role of Rani)

As director
1985 Gokul
1983 Deepar Prem
1972 Padi Pishir Barmi Baksha
1969 Megh o Roudra
1967 Chhuti (also script writer and music composer)

References

External links
 

Bengali film directors
Bengali Hindus
Film directors from Kolkata
1924 births
1990 deaths
Indian women film directors
Visva-Bharati University alumni
University of Calcutta alumni
20th-century Indian women artists
20th-century Indian film directors
People from Barisal
20th-century Indian actresses
Actresses from Kolkata
Bengali actresses
Actresses in Bengali cinema
Indian women screenwriters
20th-century Indian dramatists and playwrights
Bengali screenwriters
Bengali film score composers
Indian women composers
20th-century Indian composers
Screenwriters from Kolkata
20th-century Indian women musicians
Women musicians from West Bengal
People from New Alipore
20th-century women composers
19th-century women composers
20th-century Indian screenwriters